The Carnegie Library is a historic building on the Fisk University campus in Nashville, Tennessee. The cornerstone was laid in 1908 by William Howard Taft, who was then the U.S. Secretary of War. It was funded by Andrew Carnegie, who provided a number of academic libraries, as well as many public Carnegie libraries.

The library was designed by African-American architect Moses McKissack III; it was his  first major design project. It is a two-story Classical Revival building constructed from brick with a stone columned porch, featuring an interior light well.  The upper floor was intended to provide a venue for musical performances.

It is included in the Fisk University Historic District and was independently listed on the National Register of Historic Places in 1985. It now serves as the university's Academic Building.

References

External links

Infrastructure completed in 1908
Buildings and structures in Nashville, Tennessee
Carnegie libraries in Tennessee
Former library buildings in the United States
University and college buildings on the National Register of Historic Places in Tennessee
Neoclassical architecture in Tennessee
University and college academic libraries in the United States
Libraries on the National Register of Historic Places in Tennessee
National Register of Historic Places in Nashville, Tennessee
1908 establishments in Tennessee